Ichilo River is a Bolivian river at the foot of the Eastern Andes-Cordillera in South America. It lends its name to the Ichilo Province, one of the 15 provinces of the Santa Cruz Department of Bolivia.

Location
Ichilo River has its source in Manuel Maria Caballero Province in Santa Cruz Department at an elevation of 2,437 m at the foothills of the Racete range, where it is named Alto Ichilo (Upper Ichilo).

In its course, after joining San Matéo, it is called Ichilo, flowing in a northerly direction, where it forms the border between the Cochabamba Department and  the Santa Cruz Department.

Flow Conditions
From its source to the mouth into the Amazon the river has a total length of 2,455 km. Ichilo itself has a length of 632 km and a catchment area of 15,660 km². It has its maximum depth is 18.6 m, right below Puerto Villarroel at km 100, its maximum width is 420 m at km 75. Ichilo is one of the Bolivian rivers with a high amount of water.

Tributaries
The most important tributaries of the Ichilo are the Bolivian Río Grande, Chapare, Piraí, Sacta, Víbora, Chimoré, Choré, Ibaresito, Ibabo and Useuta rivers.

Urban Areas
Ichilo River passes the metropolitan area of Santa Cruz in the west, the largest cities on the riverbanks is Puerto Villaroel.

References

External links
Parametros de reproduccion de 4 especies de peces comerciales (Spanish)

Rivers of Cochabamba Department
Rivers of Santa Cruz Department (Bolivia)